

History 
In the legacy of Algernon Sydney Sullivan and Mary Mildred Hammond Sullivan, George Sullivan established the foundation in 1934. The Foundation primarily aims at providing financial assistance to deserving students in approximately 61 colleges. The foundation also provides education in the field of Social Entrepreneurship.

Functions 
From 1925, the foundation has helped students in diverse fields of study, by setting up scholarships with local colleges.

Board of Trustees

 Gray Williams, Jr. (Trustee Emeritus) 
 Stephan L. McDavid, Esq., President
 Thomas S. Rankin
 David C. Farrand
 Elizabeth Hamilton Verner
 Darla J. Wilkinson, Esq.
 John Clayton Crouch
 John C. Hardy
 Philip C. Watt
 Peter A. Rooney
 Perry Wilson

Notes 

Educational foundations in the United States